Greater Hungary can refer to:

Kingdom of Hungary before 1920, informally also known as "Greater Hungary" in the amateur popular literature, or "Historic Hungary" among the academic historian scholars.
Greater Hungary (irredentism), the full or partial territorial restoration of the Kingdom of Hungary, an official political goal of the Hungarian state between the two World Wars; the restoration of the unity of the territories of Kingdom of Hungary, the political goal of small marginalized groups today